Nekkonda is a village and a Mandal in Warangal district in the state of Telangana in India.

References

Villages in Warangal district